Klaus Dodds is Professor of Geopolitics at Royal Holloway, University of London.

Academia
After taking up a position at the University of Edinburgh, he was appointed to a lectureship at Royal Holloway in 1994.  He is the co-editor of the Routledge Geopolitics Book Series with Reece Jones.

Recognition
In 2005 Klaus Dodds was awarded the annual Philip Leverhulme Prize by the Leverhulme Trust for "an outstanding contribution to political geography and ‘critical
geopolitics'"

Selected publications
His books include Border Wars (Ebury Press, 2021), Geographies, Genders and Geopolitics of James Bond (Palgrave 2017, with Lisa Funnell), Geopolitics: A Very Short Introduction (OUP 2007) and Pink Ice: Britain and the South Atlantic Empire (I B Tauris 2002).

References

External links
Klaus Dodds' Faculty Profile at the University of London
Read an interview with Klaus Dodds by Theory Talks (May 2008)
Radio interview with Klaus Dodds regarding the implications of an ice-free Arctic for geopolitics and security (November 2009)
Google Books search on Klaus Dodds

Living people
Academics of Royal Holloway, University of London
Geopoliticians
Fellows of the Royal Geographical Society
Year of birth missing (living people)